Shirin Sultana is a Bangladesh Nationalist Party politician and the former Member of Parliament. She is married to Khairul Kabir Khokon. She is the General Secretary of Jatiyatabadi Mohila Dal. In 2008, she contested the general election from Dhaka-9 as a Bangladesh Nationalist Party candidate. She lost to Saber Hossain Chowdhury, the Bangladesh Awami League candidate.

References

Bangladesh Nationalist Party politicians
Living people
Women members of the Jatiya Sangsad
Year of birth missing (living people)
20th-century Bangladeshi women politicians